Komin is a village in Croatia. It is connected by the D3 highway.

The ancient Roman settlement of Pyrri is believed to have existed on a hill near Komin.

References

Populated places in Zagreb County